Samantha Ruth Prabhu is an Indian actress who primarily works in the South Indian film industry, where she has established herself as a leading actress. She is recipient several awards, including four Filmfare Awards, a Filmfare OTT Award, two Nandi Awards, a Vijay Award, six South Indian International Movie Awards, and three CineMAA Awards.

Samantha made her acting debut in 2010 with a leading role in the Telugu film Ye Maaya Chesave, for which she won the Filmfare Award for Best Female Debut – South and a Nandi Special Jury Award, in addition to her first Filmfare Award for Best Actress – Telugu nomination. Samantha subsequently earned wide recognition with her role as a NIFT student in the romantic drama, Baana Kaathadi (2010). She then went on to feature in big-budget Telugu-language action comedy film, Dookudu (2012) opposite Mahesh Babu. The film's success made Samantha one of the most sought heroines in Telugu cinema. For her performance as the love interest of a police officer in the film, she received her second nomination for the Filmfare Award for Best Actress – Telugu. She also subsequently made guest appearances in the psychological thriller film, Nadunisi Naaygal (2011) and Ekk Deewana Tha (2012). Samantha next featured in S. S. Rajamouli's live-action Telugu-Tamil bilingual project Eega (2012), portraying a micro artist who runs an NGO and takes revenge for the murder of her lover. The film became a major commercial success earning her the Filmfare Award for Best Actress – Telugu. She also won Best Actress awards at other ceremonies, including CineMAA Awards, Santosham Film Awards and SIIMA Awards. Samantha played the leading female role of Nithya in the trilingual romantic drama film Neethane En Ponvasantham (2012), for which she won Best Actress at the Vijay Awards and the Ananda Vikatan Awards, in addition to a nomination in the same category at the SIIMA Awards.

In 2013, Samantha starred in the comedy-drama film, Attarintiki Daredi, which emerged as the highest-grossing Telugu film upon release. Her performance saw her win Best Actress awards at the SIIMA Awards and the Santosham Film Awards. Portraying Anasuya Ramalingam, a naive girl trying to escape from the controlling behavior of her mother, her performance in the romantic comedy, A Aa, fetched her second Filmfare Award for Best Actress – Telugu, in addition to Best Actress awards at the IIFA Utsavam Awards, the Santosham Film Awards, and a nomination in the same category at the SIIMA Awards. 

In 2021, for her performance in the Amazon Prime Video web series, The Family Man (Season 2), Samantha won widespread critical acclaim and accolades, including the Filmfare OTT Award for Best Actress in a Drama Series and the Indian Film Festival of Melbourne Award for Best Performance (Female) in a Web Series.

State Honours

Champions of Change 
Champions of Change is an Indian National Award for promoting Gandhian values like Community Service, Social Development, Healthcare, Education, and National Unity, selected by constitutional jury members headed by K. G. Balakrishnan Former Chief Justice of India and Former Chairman NHRC. It is given annually in four categories and usually presented by the President, Vice president, Prime Minister of India or a leading figure. These awards are sponsored by the Government of India and are also conducted at the state level.

List of Awards and Nominations in Films

International Indian Film Academy Awards 
The IIFA Utsavam is an annual international event organized by the Wizcraft International Entertainment Pvt. Ltd. to honour the artistic and technical achievements of the South Indian film industry. 

Samantha has received one award.

Ananda Vikatan Awards
Ananda Vikatan Cinema Awards is an annual awards ceremony for people in the Tamil film industry. 

Samantha has received one award from two nominations.

Filmfare Awards South
Filmfare Awards South is the South Indian segment of the annual Filmfare Awards, presented by the Filmfare magazine of The Times Group to honor both artistic and technical excellence of professionals in the South Indian film industry encompassing four languages, namely, Telugu, Tamil, Malayalam, and Kannada. 

Samantha has won four awards from thirteen nominations which includes a rare double award in two languages in the same year, and only Revathi and Poornima have previously accomplished.

Nandi Awards
Presented annually by the Government of Andhra Pradesh, the Nandi Awards are the awards that recognize the excellence in Telugu cinema, Telugu theatre, and Telugu television, and Lifetime achievements in Indian cinema. 

The Nandi awards for 2012 and 2013 could not be finalized because of the extremely volatile situation in the undivided state in light of the political uncertainty caused by the Telangana statehood movement. Therefore, the recipients were awarded in 2017. 

Samantha has won two awards.

 Samantha won the Best Actress  award for Yeto Vellipoyindhi Manasu in 2017, although the film was released in 2012.

Tamil Nadu State Film Awards

Tamil Nadu State Film Awards were given for excellence in Tamil cinema in India. They were given annually to honour the best talents and provide encouragement and incentive to the South Indian film industry by the Government of Tamil Nadu. The awards were first given in 1967 and discontinued after 1970. The awards were given again in 1977 and continued till 1982. Since 1988, the awards were regularly given until it became defunct in 2008. The awards were reinstated in July 2017 after the government announced the wins for 2009–2014.

CineMAA Awards
Introduced in 2004, the CineMAA Awards are presented annually by the Maa TV Group to honor the artistic and technical excellence of professionals in the Telugu Cinema. 

Samantha has won three awards.

TSR-TV9 National Film Awards
Samantha has won one award from three nominations and one Citation of Honour in recognition to her outstanding and exemplary contribution to the world of film and entertainment.

Santosham Film Awards
Samantha won three awards from three nominations.

South Indian International Movie Awards 
The SIIMA awards for the years 2019 and 2020 were awarded in 2021, as the award ceremonies were canceled due to COVID-19 pandemic in India. 

Samantha has won six awards from fourteen nominations.

 Samantha won the Best Actress award for Oh! Baby in 2021 although the film released in 2019.

Vijay Awards
The Vijay Awards are presented by the Tamil television channel STAR Vijay to honor excellence in Tamil cinema. 

Samantha has won an award from four nominations.

Zee Cine Awards Tamil 
The Zee Cine Awards are an annual award ceremony organized by the Zee Entertainment Enterprises to honor excellence in Tamil cinema. 

Samantha has won one award.

Zee Cine Awards Telugu 
The Zee Cine Awards Telugu (ZCAT) is an annual award ceremony organized by the Zee Entertainment Enterprises to honor excellence in Telugu cinema and Telugu Music. 

Samantha has won two awards.

New York Cinematography Awards 
New York Cinematography Awards is a monthly film competition for filmmakers worldwide.

Samantha has won one award.

Critics' Choice Film Awards
Critics' Choice Film Awards is an award show presented annually across eight languages, including Hindi, Telugu, Tamil, Bengali, Marathi, Malayalam, Gujarati, and Kannada. 

Samantha has won one award from two nominations.

List of Awards and Nominations in OTT

Indian Film Festival of Melbourne Awards 
The Indian Film Festival of Melbourne (IFFM) was founded in 2012.  It is a State Government of Victoria funded annual festival based in Melbourne. It is presented by Film Victoria, and the provider is chosen through a tender process.

This marked Samantha's first nomination in the OTT arena, for which she won the award.

OTT & Digital Marketing Innovation Awards 
The Promax Awards are the world’s premier celebration of outstanding achievement in entertainment, marketing, and design. Across eleven regional and global competitions, the Promax Awards honor the teams harnessing passionate fandom to drive audiences, create value, and build the biggest brands in entertainment.

This is Samantha's second win in the OTT arena.

Filmfare OTT Awards 
The Filmfare OTT Awards are a set of awards that honor artistic and technical excellence in the Hindi-language original programming over-the-top space of India. 

This is Samantha's third nomination in the OTT arena in the same year, for which she won her first Filmfare award in the OTT arena.

Other Awards & Recognitions

Times of India

IMDb

Social Networks

See also 
 Samantha Ruth Prabhu filmography

References 

 Lists of awards received by Indian actor